Pukehina is a beach and township located in the Western Bay of Plenty District and Bay of Plenty Region of New Zealand's North Island. It consists of a white sandy beach, an estuary, farms and several homes. The area is popular with surfing, windsurfing and kite surfing. There is a campground located at the south-eastern end of the beach, and a boat ramp at the estuary.

The beach is dangerous for inexperienced surfers and swimmers due to the strong currents that are often present and steep banks at many places along the six kilometre beach. Offshore winds blow from the south-west, which are quite common since the prevailing wind in New Zealand is westerly. The area also enjoys more sunshine hours than other places in the country.

Both sharks and seals have been sighted at the beach. Several dead seals washed up on the beach in August 2019.

Demographics

Pukehina Beach had a population of 804 at the 2018 New Zealand census, an increase of 189 people (30.7%) since the 2013 census, and a decrease of 156 people (−16.2%) since the 2006 census. There were 327 households, comprising 411 males and 390 females, giving a sex ratio of 1.05 males per female. The median age was 47.8 years (compared with 37.4 years nationally), with 132 people (16.4%) aged under 15 years, 99 (12.3%) aged 15 to 29, 444 (55.2%) aged 30 to 64, and 126 (15.7%) aged 65 or older.

Ethnicities were 85.4% European/Pākehā, 25.4% Māori, 1.9% Pacific peoples, 3.0% Asian, and 2.6% other ethnicities. People may identify with more than one ethnicity.

The percentage of people born overseas was 14.2, compared with 27.1% nationally.

Although some people chose not to answer the census's question about religious affiliation, 58.6% had no religion, 29.5% were Christian, 2.2% had Māori religious beliefs, 0.7% were Hindu and 1.9% had other religions.

Of those at least 15 years old, 96 (14.3%) people had a bachelor's or higher degree, and 120 (17.9%) people had no formal qualifications. The median income was $32,100, compared with $31,800 nationally. 108 people (16.1%) earned over $70,000 compared to 17.2% nationally. The employment status of those at least 15 was that 339 (50.4%) people were employed full-time, 93 (13.8%) were part-time, and 21 (3.1%) were unemployed.

Geography

Pukehina Beach is located twenty minutes drive away from Te Puke, the Kiwifruit capital of New Zealand. On the other side of the estuary is Little Waihi and it is a short drive from there to Maketu.

To the north-west, across the estuary entrance and around the point is Newdicks Beach. To the east-north-east, out to sea, lies Whakaari / White Island, an active volcano and peak of a 1,600m submarine mountain, which is visible during fine weather.

To the south-east there is an extensive area of Māori land.

History

In 2017, Pukekina experienced exponential house price growth, due to demand for holiday homes from New Zealand, Australia, China and the United States.

A suspected drink driver crashed into a beachside home in Pukekina in November 2018, but no one was killed or injured in the crash.

The Pukehina Volunteer Fire Brigade was sued in early 2018 by a former volunteer fireman who claimed the brigade had a culture of bullying.

In 2018, developers applied for planning approval to convert a 165-hectare dairy farm into a sustainable eco-friendly lifestyle village, and a restored wetland for birds like the critically endangered Matuku.

In August 2018, State Highway 2 was blocked at Pukehina by a roaming herd of up to 80 cows.

Pukekina Surf Club received planning approval in late 2018 to replace its aging club house and shipping container with a new $2.4 million purpose-built building.

Education

References

Western Bay of Plenty District
Beaches of the Bay of Plenty Region
Populated places in the Bay of Plenty Region